Shiro is an unincorporated community and census-designated place (CDP) in Grimes County, Texas, United States located on State Highway 30 and the Burlington-Rock Island Railroad in east central Grimes County.

Education
Public education in the community of Shiro is provided by the Anderson-Shiro Consolidated Independent School District. The district has two campuses, Anderson-Shiro Elementary School (grades PK-5) and Anderson-Shiro Junior/Senior High School (grades 6–12)

References

External links

Census-designated places in Grimes County, Texas
Census-designated places in Texas
Unincorporated communities in Texas
Unincorporated communities in Grimes County, Texas